The 2022 Nevada gubernatorial election took place on November 8, 2022, to elect the governor of Nevada. Incumbent Democratic governor Steve Sisolak lost re-election to a second term, being defeated by Republican nominee and Clark County Sheriff, Joe Lombardo.

Sisolak was the first Democrat to seek re-election to Nevada's governorship since Bob Miller in 1994, and was subsequently the only incumbent governor in the United States to lose re-election in the 2022 elections. Decision Desk HQ called the race for Lombardo on November 11. Amid a slate of failed gubernatorial pickup attempts, this was the only governorship Republicans flipped in the 2022 elections, as well as the only governorship in a state carried by one party in the prior presidential election to flip to the other party. This was also the first time since Pat Quinn's defeat in the 2014 Illinois gubernatorial election that an incumbent Democratic Governor had lost re-election.

Political analysts believe that the main reason for Sisolak's defeat can be narrowed down to his handling of the COVID-19 pandemic, which he faced national criticism for from experts. Significantly, Lombardo's win marked the first time in the state's history that a Republican had won the governorship without winning either Clark County or Washoe County, home to a combined 89% of the state's population. This was due to Lombardo's more competitive margins in Clark County; Sisolak's previous opponent, Adam Laxalt, received only 40.8% of the vote there, while Lombardo received 45.4%.

Democratic primary

Candidates

Nominee
 Steve Sisolak, incumbent Governor (2019–present) and former Clark County Commissioner (2009–2019)

Eliminated in primary
 Tom Collins, former Clark County Commissioner (2005–2015) and former state assemblyman for the 1st district (1993–2001)

Declined
 Marilyn Kirkpatrick, Clark County Commissioner (2015–present)

Endorsements

Results

Republican primary

Candidates

Nominee
 Joe Lombardo, Sheriff of Clark County (2015–present)

Eliminated in primary
 Seven Achilles Evans, businessman
 Gary "Radar" Evertsen
 Joey Gilbert, attorney and former boxer
 Eddie Hamilton, businessman and perennial candidate
 Tom Heck, retired air force officer and candidate for U.S. Senate in 2016 and 2018
 John Lee, Mayor of North Las Vegas (2013–2022)
 Stan Lusak, candidate for governor in 2018
 Edward O'Brien
 Guy Nohra, venture capitalist
 Fred J. Simon, small business owner and surgeon
 William "Dock" Walls
 Amber Whitley
 Barak Zilberberg,  real estate investor

Withdrew
 Michele Fiore, Las Vegas City Councilwoman (2017–2022) and former state assemblywoman for the 4th district (2012–2016) (ran for State Treasurer)

Declined
 Heidi Gansert, state senator from the 15th district (2016–present)
 Rick Harrison, businessman and reality television personality
 Mark Hutchison, former Lieutenant Governor of Nevada (2015–2019) (endorsed Lombardo)
 Ben Kieckhefer, state senator from the 16th district (2010–2021), member of the Nevada Gaming Commission (2021–2023)
 Adam Laxalt, former Nevada Attorney General (2015–2019) and nominee for governor in 2018 (ran for the U.S. Senate)
 Derek Stevens, casino owner

Debates

Endorsements

Polling
Graphical summary

Results

Libertarian primary

Candidates

Declared
 Brandon Davis, advertising agency owner

Independent American primary

Candidates

Declared
 Ed Bridges, nominee for Nevada's 3rd congressional district in 2020

Independents

Candidates

Declared
 Bradley Beck, geologist
 Austin Billings, logistics professional
 Monique Richardson, pastor

General election

Predictions

Endorsements

Polling
Aggregate polls

Steve Sisolak vs. Joey Gilbert

Steve Sisolak vs. Dean Heller

Steve Sisolak vs. John Lee

Steve Sisolak vs. Guy Nohra

Debates

Results

See also
 Elections in Nevada
 Political party strength in Nevada
 Nevada Democratic Party
 Nevada Republican Party
 Government of Nevada
 2022 United States Senate election in Nevada
 2022 United States House of Representatives elections in Nevada
 2022 Nevada lieutenant gubernatorial election
2022 Nevada Senate election
2022 Nevada Assembly election
 2022 Nevada elections
2022 United States gubernatorial elections
 2022 United States elections

Notes

Partisan clients

References

External links
Official campaign websites
Austin Billings (I) for Governor
Ed Bridges (I) for Governor
Brandon Davis (L) for Governor
Joe Lombardo (R) for Governor
Steve Sisolak (D) for Governor

Gubernatorial
Nevada gubernatorial elections
Nevada